Ratarda guttifera is a moth in the family Cossidae. It is found in the Himalayas.

References

Natural History Museum Lepidoptera generic names catalog

Ratardinae